Surimyia is a genus of hoverflies, with three known species. They are small (4– to 5-mm) microdontine flies. Surimyia is the only hoverfly genus with the katatergum lacking microtrichia. In the subfamily Microdontinae, they are distinctive in the absence of pilosity on the postpronotum.

Biology
Larvae are presumably found in ant nests.

Distribution
They are only known from Suriname.

Species
S. minutula (van Doesburg, 1966)
S. reemeri Carvalho-Filho, 2014
S. rolanderi Reemer, 2008

References

Hoverfly genera
Microdontinae
Diptera of South America